is a Japanese singer. She is a second-generation member and the leader of the Japanese idol pop group Angerme.

Biography
Akari Takeuchi was on November 23, 1997, in Saitama, Japan.

In 2008, Takeuchi joined Hello! Project as a Hello! Pro Egg member alongside Mizuki Fukumura and Rie Kaneko. In 2009, she was chosen as a member of Minimoni's revival unit, Shin Minimoni, with fellow Hello! Pro Egg member Karin Miyamoto, S/mileage member Kanon Fukuda and Morning Musume member Linlin.

In June 2011, Takeuchi took part in auditions to find second-generation members for the Hello! Project group S/mileage. On August 14, at the last performance of the Hello! Project 2011 Summer concerts, Takeuchi as well as Kana Nakanishi, Fuyuka Kosuga, Rina Katsuta and Meimi Tamura were announced as sub-members of S/mileage. On October 16, at the launch event of S/mileage's seventh single "Tachiagirl", Tsunku announced the sub-members' promotion to official members of the group.

In October 2012, Takeuchi joined the Hello! Project and Satoyama movement unit Harvest with Morning Musume members Erina Ikuta, Ayumi Ishida, and Masaki Satō.

Takeuchi succeeded Ayaka Wada as the leader of Angerme on June 19, 2019.

She is set to graduate from Angerme in Spring 2023.

Discography
For Akari Takeuchi's releases with Angerme, see Angerme#Discography.

References

External links 
 

Angerme members
Japanese female idols
Japanese women pop singers
Minimoni members
People from Saitama (city)
Living people
1997 births
Musicians from Saitama Prefecture